Johnny Sanchez is an American actor, writer, and film producer who graduated from High School of Performing Arts (aka La Guardia H.S.) in New York City.

Early years and education
Born and raised in Brooklyn, Sanchez moved to Los Angeles and later returned to New York City, where he trained at the Bill Esper Studios. During that time, he also joined LAByrinth Theater Company, currently run by artistic directors: Philip Seymour Hoffman and John Ortiz. He was a member of LAByrinth for 12 years (1993–2005).

Career
In 2002 he formed a company, 3 Wolves Production, and co-produced the film Find Me Guilty which was directed by Sidney Lumet and was released in 2006.  In 2005 he produced, in association with the American Film Institute's directing workshop for women, and wrote A through M a dramatic short film inspired by the aftermath of 9/11. The film was directed by Heidi Miami Marshall and has won several awards in film festivals.

In April 2007, he appeared as Tito in the independent film Downtown: a street tale opposite John Savage, Burt Young, and Geneviève Bujold. As well, that same month the film Even Money, which he co-produced, was also released in theaters. The film received some very cold reviews among critics although it had a great cast that included Danny DeVito, Kim Basinger, Kelsey Grammer, Ray Liotta, and Forest Whitaker.

His other acting film credits include: Transformers, 212, Bowfinger, The Limey, The Hard Way and Outrageous Fortune.

References

External links

Living people
American male film actors
American male stage actors
Male actors from New York City
People from Brooklyn
People from Los Angeles
Fiorello H. LaGuardia High School alumni
1958 births